Salvia coriana is a perennial plant that is endemic to tropical cloud forest in Guatemala, growing at approximately  elevation on the northwestern slopes of Pico Zunil in the Sierra Chuatroj range.

S. coriana is a liana which grows up to  into the tree canopy, with erect arching branches. Inflorescences are lax 3–6 flowered verticillasters. The calyces are dark purple as they age.

It is apparently related to Salvia recurva, but grows as a liana, with smaller leaves, and shorter upper and lower corollas which are blue. The specific epithet honors Jean Coria (1926–2008), a longtime Salvia grower who was associated with the San Francisco Botanical Garden.

Notes

coriana
Flora of Guatemala